Gold is a two-CD compilation of classic singles and album tracks by British singer-songwriter, Cat Stevens, now known as Yusuf Islam. It is part of Universal Music's series of double-disc anthologies derived from their extensive back catalog. The track list starts with Stevens' early British hit "Matthew & Son" and ends with a new recording by Islam, "Indian Ocean", recorded and first released as a digital download on the iTunes Music Store to benefit 2004 Asian tsunami relief efforts.

One review of the compilation suggests that the anthology "manages to cram into two discs what 2001's On the Road to Find Out box set tried to accomplish over four."[]. Like the box set five years earlier, Islam actively participated in the compilation of the anthology. Given both the extensive track listing and the presence of a new Stevens recording (the first on which he has played guitar since he stopped recording under his stage name), this compilation apparently makes previous non-box set compilations of Stevens' work redundant and incomplete.

Track listing
All songs written by Cat Stevens except where noted. "Indian Ocean" is credited under Stevens' current legal name, Yusuf Islam.

Disc one

Disc two

References

Stevens, Cat
2005 compilation albums
Cat Stevens compilation albums
A&M Records compilation albums
Island Records compilation albums
Albums produced by Paul Samwell-Smith
Albums produced by David Kershenbaum